USS Blandy (DD-943) was a Forrest Sherman-class destroyer, named for Admiral William H. P. Blandy USN (1890–1954),

Blandy was built by the Bethlehem Steel Corporation's Fore River Shipyard in Quincy, Massachusetts, and was launched 19 December 1956, sponsored by Mrs. John M. (Hope "Toni" Blandy) Lee, daughter of Admiral Blandy; and commissioned 26 November 1957.

History

In 1958, Blandy bore the American Unknown Soldier of World War II's European Theater from Naples to a rendezvous off the Virginia Capes with Boston (CAG-1), which bore the Unknowns of the Pacific Theater and the Korean War, and Canberra (CAG-2). After the selection of the Unknown of World War II was made on board Canberra, the selected casket and the Korean Unknown were transferred to Blandy for transportation to Washington, D.C. Arriving at the U.S. Naval Gun Factory on 28 May, both caskets lay in state in the Capitol Rotunda until 30 May, after which they were interred in the Tomb of the Unknowns in Arlington National Cemetery.

In 1961, Blandy won the Marjorie Sterrett Battleship Fund Award for the Atlantic Fleet.

On October 30, 1962, Blandy tracked Soviet submarine B-130, dropping small charges and following the submarine in an attempt to bring it to the surface. After seventeen hours, the submarine's commander, Captain Nikolai Shumkov, ordered the submarine - at this point running with reduced diesel power and minimal oxygen - to surface.

In 1968, Blandy was awarded the Arleigh Burke fleet trophy award for all Atlantic Fleet.

On 7 December 1970 BLANDY was transiting the passage between the Dominican Republic and Puerto Rico, at 2118Z when the nuclear submarine USS JACK SSN 605 took her picture:

Fate
The ship was decommissioned on 5 November 1982 and struck from the Navy List on 27 July 1990.

She was sold for scrap to the Fore River Shipyard and Iron Works on 11 December 1992. When the shipyard went bankrupt in 1993, she was resold to N. R. Acquisition Incorporated of New York City by the Massachusetts Bankruptcy Court and scrapped by Wilmington Resources of Wilmington in North Carolina in 1996.

See also
List of United States Navy destroyers

References

External links 

navsource.org: USS Blandy
hazegray.org: USS Blandy
USS Blandy DD 943 Association website

 

Forrest Sherman-class destroyers
Cold War destroyers of the United States
Vietnam War destroyers of the United States
Ships built in Quincy, Massachusetts
1956 ships